Château Chambert-Marbuzet is a Bordeaux wine estate of 5 hectares located in the St.-Estèphe appellation area. It belongs to the family of Henri Duboscq.

A Cru Bourgeois in 1932, Château Chambert-Marbuzet was elevated to the upper category of Cru Bourgeois Supérieur in 2003.

Origins
The local name Chambert comes from an old agricultural tool used to dig trenches between the rows of vineyards.
It was also the name of a family of wine growers living in the hamlet of Marbuzet during the 19th century.

In 1962, the vineyard and winery were bought by Hervé Duboscq, the founder of Château Haut-Marbuzet.

Production
Located in the central southern area of St.-Estephe, on the plateaus of 'Le Bouscat' and 'Des Camots', this small vineyard benefits from a terroir of alluvial gravels resting on a clay and limestone base, as well as from a mild micro-climate thanks to the nearby Gironde estuary. Because of its limited size, the chateau only produces around 30,000 bottles per year.
The usual blend is 70% Cabernet Sauvignon with 30% Merlot, which makes it a solid and classically full-bodied St.-Estèphe.

References 

Bordeaux wine producers
Bordeaux wine
Wineries of France